The Chilodontidae, or headstanders, are a small family of freshwater characiform fishes found in northern and central South America. This family is closely related to the family Anostomidae and is sometimes treated as a subfamily, Chilodontinae, within Anostomidae.  Due to issues of homonymy with two other family-rank names called "Chilodontidae", it has been proposed that the fish family retain the spelling, and the other families will be either suppressed or renamed.

Chilodontids have colourful markings, making them popular in aquariums.

Genera
This family currently contains two genera:

 Genus Caenotropus (4 species)
 Genus Chilodus (4 species)

References

 
Fish of South America
Ray-finned fish families
Taxa named by Carl H. Eigenmann